William Henry Boyce, (November 28, 1855 – February 6, 1942) was an American lawyer and politician from Georgetown, in Sussex County, Delaware, and later from Dover, in Kent County, Delaware. He was a member of the Democratic Party, who served as Associate Justice of the Delaware Superior Court and U. S. Representative from Delaware.

Early life and family
Boyce was born at Peppers Mills in Broad Creek Hundred, Sussex County, Delaware, near Laurel. He was the son of James H. and Sarah J. Otwell Boyce. James Boyce was in the lumber and merchandise business, and later farmed. He had been county Treasurer and the state Auditor of Accounts from 1887 until 1891. William Boyce attended the Laurel Academy, and in 1882 he married Emma E. Valliant. They had two children, Valliant and James and were members of St. Paul's Episcopal Church in Georgetown.

Delaware lawyer
Beginning his career as an educator, Boyce was principal of the public schools at Laurel from 1875 until 1880, and at Oxford, Maryland, in 1880/1881. He was then appointed Recorder of Deeds for Sussex County, Delaware and served in that office from 1881 until 1886. During this time he studied the law under Alfred P. Robinson, was admitted to the bar in 1887, and began a practice in Georgetown, Delaware. During these years he served variously as president of the Board of Education from 1883 until 1886; captain of Company G, Delaware National Guard from 1887 until 1890; and president of the Georgetown Town Council from 1895 until 1897.

Boyce was also chairman of the Sussex County Democratic Committee from 1893 until 1897 and a delegate to the Democratic National Conventions in 1896 and 1924. He was appointed Delaware Secretary of State, and served from January 19, 1897 until June 17, 1897, when he was appointed Associate Justice of the Delaware Supreme Court. Boyce served there for 24 years, from June 17, 1897 until June 15, 1921.

United States House of Representatives
Following his retirement, Boyce was elected to the U.S. House of Representatives in 1922, and served one term from March 4, 1923 until March 3, 1925. He defeated incumbent Republican U.S. Representative Caleb R. Layton. Layton claimed he was beaten by blacks, angered by his refusal to support an anti-lynching law in the Congress. Seeking re-election in 1924, Boyce lost to Republican Robert G. Houston, a journalist, also from Georgetown. Boyce was not "flashy," but was highly respected throughout the state. However, Houston had led the fight against J. Edward Addicks in Sussex County, had worked to clean up corruption in elections, and had been state Chairman of the Progressive Party. After his loss, Boyce resumed the practice of law in Dover, until his retirement from active practice in 1936.

Death and legacy
Boyce died at Dover and is buried there in the Christ Episcopal Church Cemetery.

Almanac
Elections are held the first Tuesday after November 1. U.S. Representatives took office March 4 and have a two-year term.

References

External links
Biographical Directory of the U.S. Congress 
Delaware State Courts
Delaware’s Members of Congress

The Political Graveyard 

1855 births
1942 deaths
19th-century American Episcopalians
20th-century American Episcopalians
People from Laurel, Delaware
People from Dover, Delaware
Secretaries of State of Delaware
Delaware lawyers
Associate Judges of Delaware
Burials in Dover, Delaware
Delaware Progressives (1912)
Democratic Party members of the United States House of Representatives from Delaware
People from Georgetown, Delaware